"Versace" is the debut single by American hip hop group Migos. It was released in July 2013, by Quality Control Music. The hook "Versace Versace Versace was created by Peter Thomson who spit the hook to the Migos and Quality Control when they were in Springfield Massachusetts. The track, which was included on their mixtape Y.R.N. (Young Rich Niggas) (2013), was produced by Zaytoven. Following a remix by Canadian rapper Drake, the song became popular and peaked at number 99 on the US Billboard Hot 100 chart. Drake performed it at the 2013 iHeartRadio Music Festival. The song is ranked as one of the 100 songs that defined the 2010s decade by Billboard.

Background
The beat of the song, produced by Zaytoven, was also given to Soulja Boy, who used it for his song "OMG Part 2" two years earlier in 2011.

Legacy and flow
Versace is highly notable for bringing mainstream attention to the triplet flow within hip hop. While not the first song to do so, it is considered to be responsible for bringing the particular style of rapping, later coined the 'Versace' flow, to the forefront of hip hop in the 2010s.

Music video
The official music video, directed by Gabriel Hart, was released on September 30, 2013. It shows Migos and Zaytoven at a luxurious mansion, wearing Versace clothes and accessories. The video also features a snippet of Migos' second single "Hannah Montana". As of January 2020, it has gained over 34 million views on YouTube. Celebrities like Soulja Boy, Rich The Kidd, Zaytoven, and Donatella Versace appear as cameos for the Music Video.

Remixes
Pop singer Justin Bieber also posted a short video online of him rapping to the song. A remix followed by a music video was released by professional boxer Adrien Broner. American rapper Johnny Polygon, also recorded a remix, which he re-titled "Old Navy". Kap G has remixed "Versace" on his mixtape Migo Work. American rapper Tyga has remixed "Versace" on his mixtape Well Done 4. French rapper Swagg Man also made a remix to the song, as did Austrian rapper Why SL Know Plug, formerly known as Money Boy.

Accolades
"Versace" was placed in multiple year-end lists of 2013. XXL named it one of the top five hip hop songs of 2013.

Chart performance

Year-end charts

Certifications

Release history

References

2013 debut singles
2013 songs
Migos songs
Music videos directed by Gabriel Hart
Songs written by Zaytoven
Song recordings produced by Zaytoven
Songs written by Quavo
Songs written by Offset (rapper)
Songs written by Takeoff (rapper)
Versace